Sudanese kinship, also referred to as the descriptive system, is a kinship system used to define family. Identified by Lewis Henry Morgan in his 1871 work Systems of Consanguinity and Affinity of the Human Family, the Sudanese system is one of the six major kinship systems (Eskimo, Hawaiian, Iroquois, Crow, Omaha and Sudanese).

The Sudanese kinship system is the most complicated of all kinship systems.  It maintains a separate designation for almost every one of Ego's kin, based on their distance from Ego, their relation, and their gender. Ego's father is distinguished from Ego's father's brother and from Ego's mother's brother. Ego's mother is similarly distinguished from Ego's mother's sister and from Ego's father's sister.  For cousins, there are eight possible terms.

Usage
The system is named after the peoples of South Sudan.  The Sudanese kinship system also existed in ancient Latin-speaking and Anglo-Saxon cultures.  It exists today among present-day Arab and Turkish cultures. It tends to co-occur with patrilineal descent, and it is often said to be common in complex and stratified cultures.

Variants

Balkan kinships such as Bulgarian, Serbian, and Bosniak follow this system for different patrilinear and matrilinear uncles but collapse mother's sister and father's sister into the same term of "aunt" and Croatian and Macedonian further collapse the offspring of the uncles into one term.

On the opposite side, Chinese adds an additional dimension of relative age. Ego's older siblings are distinguished from younger, as are those of Ego's parents. One must specify whether older (e.g.  Mandarin 哥哥 gēge) or younger (e.g. Mandarin 弟弟 dìdi). Similarly, a term for "uncle" or (in at least in some varieties of Chinese, including Mandarin) even "father's brother" does not exist without circumlocution; the speaker must either specify "father's older brother" (e.g. Mandarin 伯伯 bóbo) or "father's younger brother" (e.g. Mandarin 叔叔 shūshu). This does not apply to maternal uncles.

See also
Chinese kinship

References

Further reading
William Haviland, Cultural Anthropology, Wadsworth Publishing, 2002.

External links
The nature of kinship
Sudanese kin terms, University of Manitoba

Kinship and descent
Kinship terminology